Crassula rupestris, called buttons on a string, is a species of Crassula native to the Cape Provinces of South Africa. It has gained the Royal Horticultural Society's Award of Garden Merit. It is also called bead vine, necklace vine, and rosary vine.

Subspecies
The following subspecies are currently accepted:

Crassula rupestris subsp. commutata (Friedr.) Toelken
Crassula rupestris subsp. marnieriana (Huber & Jacobsen) Toelken

References

rupestris
Flora of South Africa
Plants described in 1782